The Ontario Open Heritage Classic was a golf tournament on the Canadian Tour that was held in Ontario, Canada. It was founded in 1999, three years after the long-standing Ontario Open was last played, and ran for four years, through 2002. It was hosted at a different venue every year.

In the inaugural tournament, Arron Oberholser set a new Canadian Tour record for the largest winning margin when he finished 11 strokes ahead of Ian Leggatt and Tony Carolan.

Winners

References

Former PGA Tour Canada events
Golf tournaments in Ontario
Recurring sporting events established in 1999
Recurring sporting events disestablished in 2002